A list of Chinese symbols, designs, and art motifs, including decorative ornaments, patterns, auspicious symbols, and iconography elements, used in Chinese visual arts, sorted in different theme categories. Chinese symbols and motifs are more than decorative designs as they also hold symbolic but hidden meanings which have been used and understood by the Chinese people for thousand of years; they often influenced by nature, which include the fauna, the flora, landscape, and clouds. Chinese symbols often have auspicious meanings associated to them, such as good fortune, happiness, and also represent what would be considered as human virtues, such as filial piety, loyalty, and wisdom, and can even convey the desires or wishes of the Chinese people to experience the good things in life. There are also special symbols in Chinese arts, such as the qilin, and the Chinese dragon. According to Chinese beliefs, being surrounding by objects which are decorated with such auspicious symbols and motifs was and continues to be believed to increase the likelihood that those wishes would be fulfilled even in present-day. Chinese symbols and motifs are often found in Chinese decorative arts, porcelain ware, clothing, and personal adornments.

Categorized sets or collections 

 Chinese zodiac
 Eight Auspicious pattern (Bajixiang 八吉祥): The Eight Auspicious symbols of Buddhism
 Eight treasures (Babao 八寶)/ Eight precious things
 Flowers of the Four Seasons
 Four gentlemen
 Five Poisons
 Four symbols
 Twelve ornaments

Natural landscape and cosmology

Clouds, sun, stars, and moon

Waves and sea

Animals

Mammals

Birds 
Birds were symbols of literary refinement of the scholars with ability to fly towards the Heaven.

Fish

Insects

Imaginary animals

Chimeral animals

Bird-like creatures

Animal-like creatures

Composite

Plants, flowers, and trees

Flowers

Trees and plants

Composite

Fruits, vegetables, kernels, mushroom, and seeds

Fruits

Mushroom

Inanimate objects

Chinese characters

Taoist religion

Taoist deities and immortals 

The Queen Mother of the West, Xi Wangmu, who is often figured in Chinese stories, is associated with symbols of longevity in Chinese arts as the peaches of immortality are believed to grow in her celestial peach orchard according to folklore stories.

Taoist symbols

Buddhism religion

Buddhist entities

Borders/ meander, and repeated patterns

Related concepts 

 Five blessings
 Chinese numerology
 Five colours
 Yansheng coins

See also 

 Chinese ornamental gold silk
 Chinese embroidery
 Chinese auspicious ornaments in textile and clothing

Notes

References

Bibliography 

 
 
 
 

Chinese art
Chinese folk art
Chinese traditions
Chinese iconography
Visual motifs 
Ornaments